Boldraž is a small settlement north of the town of Metlika in the White Carniola area of southeastern Slovenia. The entire area is part of the traditional region of Lower Carniola and is now included in the Southeast Slovenia Statistical Region.

Name
Boldraž was attested in written sources as Wodidraß in 1498.

Cultural heritage
There is a small chapel in the village. It was built in the late 18th century.

References

External links
 
Boldraž on Geopedia

Populated places in the Municipality of Metlika